Si Quieres Verme Llorar (Eng.: "If You Want to See Me Cry")  is the major label debut studio album released by Regional Mexican singer Jenni Rivera on May 25, 1999, by Sony Music. It was re-released in 2008 by Cintas Acuario.

Reception 

David Jeffries, in his review for AllMusic, calls Rivera's Si Quieres Verme Llorar "a low point in her discography". She does flirt with mariachi and ranchera music, a sound she "wouldn't experiment with again until 2009", but the album should be considered a "transitional work" in Rivera's career.

Track listing

References

External links 

Jenni Rivera albums
1999 debut albums